Peter Hurley is the President of the South Australian branch of the Australian Hotels Association and on the board of the Australian Broadcasting Corporation.

References

Living people
Year of birth missing (living people)
Place of birth missing (living people)